Homaloxestis antibathra is a moth in the family Lecithoceridae. It was described by Edward Meyrick in 1916. It is found in southern India.

The wingspan is about 14 mm. The forewings are dark fuscous and the hindwings are grey.

References

Moths described in 1916
Homaloxestis